Isabella Goldstein (born Isabella Hawkins) (31 December 1849 – 12 January 1916) lived in Victoria, Australia, was an Australian suffragist and social reformer, one of the organisers of the Women's Suffrage Petition ("Monster petition") to the Victorian state parliament and the mother of Vida Goldstein.

Personal life 
Isabella Hawkins was born on the family's property "Cashmere" in Portland, Victoria, the eldest daughter of Scottish-born squatter Samuel Proudfoot Hawkins and his first wife, Jeanie Hutcheson. She was named after her maternal grandmother, Isabella Hutcheson (Taylor) and followed by six other children. The family moved to another property, "Melville Forest", and were comparatively wealthy. It is reported that, even as a child, Isabella noticed the inequalities between the farmhands' and shepherds' living conditions and her family's homestead. Samuel Hawkins had episodes of mental illness and alcoholism. Isabella's mother died in July 1864. Samuel employed a governess, Mary Anne Adamson, whom he later married in August 1865. In April 1867, when Isabella was 17, her father died. Isabella lived at Melville Forest until her marriage a year later and received an equal share of her father's estate.

On 3 June 1868, at 18 years old, Isabella married Irish born Lieutenant Colonel Jacob Robert Yannasch Goldstein (10 March 1839 – 21 September 1910) then became known as Isabella Goldstein. The couple had five children (four daughters and one son): Vida, Lina, Elsie Belle, Aileen and Selwyn. The first and most famous child, Vida, was born in Portland in April 1869. The family lived in Portland, Warrnambool, Malvern, St Kilda, Melbourne city and South Yarra, Victoria. Although Jacob was also involved in social reform and encouraged independence in his daughters, he was anti-suffrage and became estranged from Isabella later in life. After Jacob died in 1910, Isabella built her own house in South Yarra.

Faith and social reform 
Goldstein is reported as having a deep Christian faith and commitment to social reform which she instilled in her daughter, Vida, "Isabella was a Presbyterian and Jacob a Unitarian…. While helping the less fortunate is part of a Christian's duty, and many middle-class people made a hobby of it, Isabella and Jacob were genuinely compassionate and motivated by a fundamental sense of justice and equality." The family attended Scots Church and later the Australian Church where Dr Charles Strong encouraged a deep involvement in social welfare work. Jacob and Isabella were involved in the Charity Organisation Society for many years from 1887. At a charity conference in 1897, Jacob read a paper written by Isabella, "United and Systematic Charity" in which she argued that scientific principles should be applied to preventing poverty, charity from all sources should be coordinated and work should be found for poor families rather than just giving them temporary relief. Jacob later became the honorary superintendent of the Leongatha Labour Colony from 1892.

Isabella Goldstein was an early feminist and suffragist and co-founded the United Council for Woman Suffrage. She was a member with Annette Bear-Crawford of the Victorian Women’s Suffrage Society, formed on 22 June 1884 with Henrietta Dugdale as president. Isabella brought up her more famous daughter, Vida, as a feminist and suffragist and involved Vida in the collection of signatures for the Women's Suffrage Petition.

Goldstein took particular care of the families in the slums of Collingwood, accompanying Strong on visits to Collingwood in 1891 and talking with women who did sweatshop work at home. Later in 1892, Strong and Goldstein distributed tickets for meat and potatoes to hundreds of families in Collingwood and in 1893 she held a cake fair and musical program at her home in East St Kilda to raise funds for Collingwood's neglected children and involved her daughters in a jumble sale in Collingwood Town Hall to benefit the Australian Church Social Improvement Children's Aid and Friendly Help Society She helped establish the Collingwood crèche where widows and deserted wives could send their infants during the day to be washed and fed and cared for, while the mothers worked. She was a committee member of the National Anti-Sweating League, which first met in July 1895 and campaigned for changes to labour laws to provide a minimum wage and limitation to working hours for women and men working in factories as well as women who took in piecemeal work at home. Her son-in-law, Henry Hyde Champion, was also on the committee as well as Dr Strong.

With Annette Bear-Crawford, she helped with the Queen Victoria Shilling Fund to found the Queen Victoria Hospital for Women and Children. "The Queen's Jubilee Celebration in Victoria was made the occasion to appeal for funds for women throughout Victoria to establish a women's hospital staffed by women doctors ... Miss Bear suggested the idea to a small group - Dr C Stone, Mrs I Goldstein, Vida and H H Champion, in Mrs Goldstein's home." Goldstein also helped introduce female factory inspectors, women members on the Benevolent Asylum Committee, and women on School Board Committees.

Later in the 1890s, Isabella and Vida became Christian Scientists. In those later years, Isabella focussed on her Christian Science work, supported Vida in her causes and helped her daughter, Elsie, and her husband, H H Champion (who was partly paralysed after a stroke in 1901). Isabella helped Champion and Elsie open the Book Lovers' Library in 1896, which Elsie mainly managed and employed mostly women.

Death and legacy 
Goldstein died at her South Yarra home on 12 January 1916, where she lived with her daughter, Vida. Goldstein's legacy was as a suffragist and feminist mentor to her daughters Vida and Elsie as well as her commitment to social reform. Her legacy is summarised well in her obituaries:

References

External links 

 Women's Suffrage Petition. The database of names can be searched. The names of Isabella Goldstein and her two daughters, Vida and Elsie Belle appear on the petition.

Australian suffragists
1849 births
1916 deaths
Australian Christian Scientists
Australian women's rights activists